The Wild Pony is a made for pay-TV movie produced in 1983 by Kevin Sullivan (Anne of Green Gables) and Eda Lishman. Sullivan and Lishman also co-wrote the screenplay based on the book "The Year of the Black Pony" by American author Walt Morey. "The Wild Pony" has the distinction of being the first example of a Canadian film produced specifically for pay-TV. The film, directed by Kevin Sullivan and starring Canadian Actors Marilyn Lightstone, Art Hindle and Josh Byrne, was filmed on a ranch west of Pincher Creek, Alberta against the backdrop of the Canadian Rockies.

Synopsis
To save her ranch after the accidental death of her husband, Sarah Fellows (Marilyn Lightstone) marries Frank Chase (Art Hindle), the man responsible for the mishap. She and her children move into Frank’s house, but Sarah makes it clear that it is only a "marriage of convenience". Deeply resenting the situation, her twelve-year-old son Christopher (Josh Byrne) becomes withdrawn and increasingly obsessed with a renegade black pony that runs unfettered through the valley. Frank realizes that Christopher needs the pony and buys it for him, despite Sarah’s strong objections.

Cast List
 Marilyn Lightstone – Sarah Fellows/Chase
 Art Hindle – Frank Chase
 Josh Byrne – Christopher Fellows
Kelsey McLeod – Jennifer Fellows
Murray Ord – Tom Fellows
Paul Jolicoeur – Arlo Grayson
Bob Collins – Sheriff Pack
 Tommy Banks – Sam Fletcher
Mark Kay – Store Keeper
Phillip Clark – Minister
Jack Goth – Judge
Ron Tucker – Blacksmith
Roberta Meili – Sam Fletcher’s Daughter

List of Awards
CFTA Award – Best Drama, 1983

References

External links
Sullivanmovies.com - Official Wild Pony Page

Films directed by Kevin Sullivan
Films shot in Alberta